The Call of the Canyon is a 1923 American silent Western film directed by Victor Fleming and starring Richard Dix, Lois Wilson, and Marjorie Daw. Based on the novel The Call of the Canyon by Zane Grey, the film is about a returning war veteran who is nursed back to health by a compassionate Arizona girl. The Call of the Canyon was filmed in Red Rock Crossing in Sedona, Arizona.

Plot
Glenn Kilbourne (Richard Dix) returns from the war and travels to Arizona to regain his health. There he is nursed back to health by an Arizona girl, Flo Hutter (Marjorie Daw). Kilbourne's fiancée, Carley Burch (Lois Wilson), arrives in Arizona but soon becomes disillusioned with life in the West and returns to New York. Sometime later, Flo is seriously injured in an accident. Wanting to repay her for restoring him back to health, Glenn asks her to marry him. On their wedding day, Carley returns to Arizona from New York looking for Glenn. When Flo sees that Glenn and Carley are still in love, she calls off her wedding to Glenn and marries another admirer, Lee Stanton (Leonard Clapham).

Cast

Preservation status
Once thought to be a lost film, The Call of the Canyon was one of ten silent films digitally preserved in Russia's film archive Gosfilmofond and provided to the Library of Congress in October 2010.

See also
 List of rediscovered films

References

External links

 
 
 
 

1923 films
1923 Western (genre) films
Films based on works by Zane Grey
American black-and-white films
Films based on short fiction
Films directed by Victor Fleming
Films set in Arizona
Paramount Pictures films
1920s rediscovered films
Rediscovered American films
Silent American Western (genre) films
1920s American films